Little Langton is a hamlet and civil parish in North Yorkshire, England. The population of the hamlet was estimated at 50 in 2015. As the population remained less than 100 at the 2011 census, details were included in the civil parish of Thrintoft.

References

External links

Hamlets in North Yorkshire
Civil parishes in North Yorkshire